Georg Leib (9 March 1846 in Wallerstein – 1910 in Munich) was the Royal Councillor of Commerce and ran a very successful real-estate company in Munich.

Georg Leib was a scaffolding-specialist. He was the head of the Bavarian County Administration. There are two streets named after him, one in Munich and one in Haar .

After the trademark tower of Venice, (St Mark's Campanile), collapsed in 1902, Leib donated the scaffolding for it to rebuild it. The majority wanted to tear the tower down at the time. Georg Leib was the first philanthropist to donate to the cause of rebuilding Venice's tower. Leib also built the scaffolding for the Dome of Milan, (Milan Cathedral), the original Thalkirchner Bridge  - and the Sanatorium named after him in Haar, Munich. The latter was the first institution of the kind in Germany. 
Georg Leib was one of the builders of St. Joseph's Cloister (St Joseph (München). He donated his services to build St. Anton's in Munich (St. Anton (München)), and was awarded the royal prince regent's medal for his efforts.

Georg Leib is buried in the Old Cemetery (Alter Südlicher Friedhof) in Munich (grave section 31-1-2).
Georg Leib's sister married the royal privy councillor Max Niedermayer, who became an honorary citizen of Landshut (Liste der Ehrenbürger von Landshut).
Georg Leib's descendants were his grandson Otto Leib, and granddaughter Lea von Langsdorff who married one of the first private and artistic pilots, Hans von Langsdorff.

References

 St.Anton Munich
 St.Joseph Kloster

1846 births
1910 deaths